The men's artistic team all-around competition at the 1936 Summer Olympics was held at the Waldbühne on 10 and 11 August. It was the eighth appearance of the event.

Competition format

The gymnastics format returned to the aggregation format used in 1928 but not in 1932. Each nation entered a team of eight gymnasts (Bulgaria had only 7). All entrants in the gymnastics competitions performed both a compulsory exercise and a voluntary exercise, with the scores summed to give a final total. The scores in each of the six apparatus competitions were added together to give individual all-around scores; the top six individual scoring gymnasts on each team were summed to give a team all-around score – the scores of any other gymnasts competing on that team were not used at all towards the team total. No separate finals were contested.

It is also worth noting that the Individual All-Around Champion from the preceding Olympics, Romeo Neri, was injured and unable to fully help his 5th-place finishing Italian team

Results

References

Men's artistic team all-around
1936
Men's events at the 1936 Summer Olympics